Sportsklubben Nationalkameratene is a Norwegian sports club from Trondheim, Sør-Trøndelag. It has sections for association football and team handball.

It was established on 21 May 1920.

The men's football team currently plays in the Fifth Division, the sixth tier of Norwegian football. It last played in the Second Division in 1998, and last in the Third Division in 2008.

References

 Official site 

Football clubs in Norway
SK Nationalkameratene
Association football clubs established in 1920
SK Nationalkameratene